Radeon 6000 series may refer to two different series of graphics processing units (GPUs) developed by Advanced Micro Devices (AMD):

 Radeon RX 6000 series, released in 2020
 Radeon HD 6000 series, released in 2010